Shrirang Chandu Barne is Balasahebanchi Shiv Sena politician from Chinchwad, Pune, India. He was the member of the 16th Lok Sabha of India and Re-Elected for 17th Lok Sabha of India. He representing the Maval constituency of Maharashtra. In 2014 Lok Sabha Election he defeated sitting MLA Laxman Pandurang Jagtap who contested from Peasants and Workers Party of India by 157394 votes by obtaining 512223 votes against 354829 and in 2019 Lok Sabha Election he defeated Parth Ajit Pawar who contested from Nationalist Congress Party by 215913 votes by obtaining 720663 votes against 504750.

He has been awarded with Sansad Ratna Award, Top performers of Indian Parliament in 2015, 2016, 2017, 2018 and 2019.
In 2020 he has been Honoured with 'Sansad Maha Ratna Award' for sustained qualitative performance in the 16th Lok Sabha. This Award is presented once in five years.

Political career
 1997: Elected as Corporator in Pimpri-Chinchwad Municipal Corporation 
 1999: Elected as Chairman of Standing committee Pimpri-Chinchwad Municipal Corporation
 2002: Re-elected as Corporator in Pimpri-Chinchwad Municipal Corporation
 2002-05: Leader of Opposition-Pimpri Chinchwad Municipal & Member Pune District Planning Committee
 2007: Re-elected as Corporator in Pimpri-Chinchwad Municipal Corporation
 2012: Re-elected as Corporator in Pimpri-Chinchwad Municipal Corporation
 2012: Elected as group leader of Shiv Sena in Pimpri-Chinchwad Municipal Corporation
 2014: Elected to 16th Lok Sabha
 1 Sep.2014 onward: Member, Standing Committee on Defense Member, Consultative Committee on Road Transport & Shipping Member, Parliamentary Committee on Official Language
2015: Honored with 'Sansad Ratna' Award, for their top performance during the first four sessions of the 16th Lok Sabha. 
2016: Honoured with 'Sansad Ratna' Award in 7th Edition of Sansad Ratna Award for top performing Parliamentarians of 16th Lok Sabha (up to 7th session).
 2019: Re- Elected to 17th Lok Sabha.
 13 Sep.2019 onward: Member :- Standing Committee on Finance, Member:- Consultative Committee on Tourism  Culture, Member: -Parliamentary Committee on Official Language (First sub-committee) and सदस्य:- आलेख और साक्ष्य समिति 
 2020 Honoured with 'Sansad Maha Ratna Award' for sustained qualitative performance in the 16th Lok Sabha. This Award is presented once in five years.
 Books Published by Shrirang Barne
(i) Shabdved, (ii) Samrth Ladvaiya, (iii). Apla Vaibhavshali Maval-The Glory of Mave Lok Sabha, (iv). Me Anubhav Leli Sansad- Based on parliamentary experience as being elected to the Lok Sabha for the first time.

References

External links
 official twitter account
 Shiv Sena Home Page
 Shrirang Barne Lok Sabha Profile

Living people
1964 births
Shiv Sena politicians
Lok Sabha members from Maharashtra
India MPs 2014–2019
People from Pimpri-Chinchwad
Marathi politicians
Maharashtra municipal councillors
India MPs 2019–present
Indian National Congress politicians